Microfinance Insights was an international print magazine that published quarterly. The magazine featured analysis and commentary on the microfinance sector, updates on the latest trends, and profiles of global sector players. Each issue focused on a theme from the microfinance sector.

History and profile
The first issue of Microfinance Insights was released in October 2006.

Microfinance Insights was a publication of Intellecap, a social business advisory firm. The magazine ceased publication in 2009.

See also
Venture Capital
Capital market

References

2006 establishments in India
2009 disestablishments in India
Defunct magazines published in India
English-language magazines published in India
Business magazines published in India
Quarterly magazines published in India
Magazines established in 2006
Magazines disestablished in 2009